Sir Hugh Lancelot (Lance) Brisbane (16 March 1893 – 4 February 1966) was a prominent Western Australian industrialist and businessman.

References

1893 births
1966 deaths
People from Melbourne
20th-century Australian businesspeople